Yue Zhongqi (岳鍾琪, 1686 – 1754) was a Chinese military commander of the Qing dynasty. He was a descendant of Yue Fei, and served as Ministry of War and Viceroy of Chuan-Shaan during the reign of the Yongzheng Emperor.

Yue succeeded Nian Gengyao as Viceroy of Chuan-Shaan from 1725 to 1732. Zeng Jing, a xiucai in Hunan, sent his student Zhang Xi (張熙) to Xi'an in 1728, attempted to incite Yue to organize a plot to overthrow the Manchu-led Qing dynasty. Yue refused him and exposed his plot. Yue was commended by Yongzheng Emperor; Zeng Jing was easily caught and transported to Beijing.

Yue Zhongqi, much like the man who preceded him as Governor-General of Sichuan-Shaanxi (川陝總督), Nian Gengyao, acted as an important advisor and intermediary with regards to Tibetan affairs, which included navigating the Tibetan civil war of 1727-28.

Yue also participated in the Dzungar–Qing Wars. He conquered Tibet and seized Lhasa with the 2,000 Green Standard soldiers and 1,000 Manchu soldiers of the "Sichuan route" in 1720. He was accused of "arrogancy and unlawful act" (驕蹇不法) by Jalangga (查郎阿) and was stripped of official position in 1733. He didn't return to politics until 1748. He participated in Jinchuan campaigns, and later put down the rebellion of Gyurme Namgyal together with Ts'ereng (策楞).

See also
 Qing dynasty in Inner Asia
 Tibet under Qing rule
 Treason by the Book

References

1686 births
1754 deaths
Qing dynasty generals
Viceroys of Shaan-Gan
18th-century Chinese military personnel